Ilir Kadia (born 4 October 1957) is a journalist from Albania. He has been working for the BBC World Service since 1993. His book Floke te Lagur (Wet Hair), a collection of short stories, came as a surprise to the Albanian public in 2004. The book was praised by the literary world as well as the public - described as "the stories have by now become part of the reader's patrimony." Since then Kadia has published two other books titled Kontrate per Kadaver (Cadaver Contract),  and Nata e pare e tradhetise (First Night of Treason). All the books are composed of 20 short stories on umpteen topics of Albanian life.

References

External links
Gazeta Metropol - Publishing
Tirana Observer - Culture section
Gazeta Albania - news
AlbanianBook - Letersi Artistike Shqipe

Albanian journalists
20th-century Albanian writers
Living people
21st-century Albanian writers
Albanian male writers
Albanian male short story writers
Albanian short story writers
BBC newsreaders and journalists
British male journalists
Albanian-language writers
20th-century short story writers
21st-century short story writers
20th-century British male writers
21st-century British male writers
1957 births